"Funny How Time Slips Away" is a song written by Willie Nelson and first recorded by country singer Billy Walker. Walker's version was issued as single by Columbia Records in June 1961 and peaked at number 23 on the Hot C&W Sides chart.

Notable cover versions
1961 - Jimmy Elledge released a version as a single on RCA Victor, peaking at number 22 on the Billboard Hot 100. His version, which was recorded on September 7, 1961, sold more than one million copies.
1962 - Arthur Alexander released a version on his country soul album You Better Move On.
1962 - Willie Nelson recorded his own version for his debut studio album ...And Then I Wrote (Liberty 3239).
1963 - Wanda Jackson released a version on Love Me Forever.
1963 - Johnny Tillotson released a version as a single on Cadence, peaking at number 50 on the Billboard Hot 100.
1964 - Joe Hinton had a major crossover hit with his version, which went to number 1 on the Cash Box R&B chart and number 13 on the Billboard Hot 100.
1964 - Brenda Lee released a version on the album In The Mood For Love: Classic Ballads, an MCA Nashville compilation released in 1998 consisting of releases drawn from 11 different albums from 1961-1971.
1966 - Georgie Fame released a version on his studio album Sweet Things.
1970 - Elvis Presley covered the song on the album Elvis Country, recorded in RCA's Studio B in Nashville. 
1973 - Al Green released a version on his Call Me album, which reached number 10 on the Billboard pop albums chart and number 1 on the "Black albums" chart.
1974 - Bryan Ferry covered the song on his second solo album Another Time, Another Place. 
1975 - Narvel Felts released a version that peaked at number 12 on the Hot Country Singles chart.
1976 - Dorothy Moore released a version that reached number 7 on the soul charts and number 57 on the Hot 100.
1982 - The Spinners recorded a version that peaked at number 43 on the soul chart and number 67 on the Hot 100.
1994 - Al Green and Lyle Lovett released a version on the compilation album Rhythm, Country and Blues. Green won his ninth Grammy Award for this version in the category of "Best Pop Collaboration with Vocals".
1999 - Cybill Shepherd duetted the song with 'Cybill' co-star Tom Wopat on the album Songs from the Cybill Show.
2017 - A duet version between Nelson and Glen Campbell appeared on Campbell's final album, Adiós, and won both artists the 2017 CMA Award for Musical Event of the Year.
2022 - Dr. John from his posthumous album Things Happen That Way.

References

1961 singles
1964 singles
1975 singles
1976 singles
1982 singles
Songs written by Willie Nelson
Willie Nelson songs
Billy Walker (musician) songs
Dorothy Moore songs
The Spinners (American group) songs
Grammy Award for Best Pop Collaboration with Vocals
1961 songs
Columbia Records singles